Malanquilla is a municipality in the province of Zaragoza, Aragon, Spain. According to the 2004 census (INE), the municipality has a population of 132 inhabitants.

The town is located at the western end of the Sierra de la Virgen, between this range and the Moncayo Massif.

References

Municipalities in the Province of Zaragoza